The 1997 Tour de Suisse was the 61st edition of the Tour de Suisse cycle race and was held from 17 June to 26 June 1997. The race started in Romanshorn and finished in Zürich. The race was won by Christophe Agnolutto of the Casino team.

General classification

References

1997
Tour de Suisse